Seiichi Aritome from the SK Hynix Inc., Gyeonggi-do, South Korea was named a Fellow of the Institute of Electrical and Electronics Engineers (IEEE) in 2014 for contributions to flash memory technologies.

Aritome received M.E. and Ph.D. degrees from Graduate School of Hiroshima University in Hiroshima, Japan, in 1985 and 2013, respectively. After obtaining his M.E., he joined Toshiba and then worked for Micron Technology in 2003 and Powerchip in 2007. He then joined SK Hynix Inc, where, for the past 25 years, he was responsible for the development of NAND flash memory chips. Aritome has over 280 U.S. patents and 50 papers to his name. He is a member of the IEEE Electron Devices Society.

References

20th-century births
Living people
Japanese engineers
Electrical engineers
Hiroshima University alumni
Fellow Members of the IEEE
Year of birth missing (living people)
Place of birth missing (living people)